The West Virginia Basic Skills/Computer Education Program is a program of the West Virginia Department of Education. Its goals are to improve basic literacy and arithmetic skills in addition to computer ability.

Education in West Virginia